Upola is a ghost town in Elk County, Kansas, United States.

History
A post office was opened in Upola in 1887, and remained in operation until it was discontinued in 1909.

References

Further reading

External links
 Elk County maps: Current, Historic, KDOT

Unincorporated communities in Elk County, Kansas
Unincorporated communities in Kansas